Communist Working Groups (in Swedish: Kommunistiska Arbetsgrupperna) was a political organization in Sweden. KAG was formed in January 1971, at the time of the merger of the Bolshevik Group and the Revolutionary Marxists (RM) into the League of Revolutionary Marxists (RMF). The founders of KAG wanted a less well-knit group than RMF. KAG was based in Stockholm and Gothenburg. In Göteborg the majority of RM, led by Göte Kildén, had joined KAG.

By 1972 KAG dissolved, and by that time many of its members had joined RMF. Östberg  speculates that several of the KAG members might have joined VPK.

Political parties established in 1971
Defunct communist parties in Sweden
Trotskyist organizations in Sweden
1971 establishments in Sweden